Walled Lake Northern (WLN) is a public high school in the Walled Lake Consolidated School District, located in Commerce Township, Michigan in Greater Detroit. It was completed in April, 2003 by TMP Associates, Inc. at a cost of $67.5 million.  The school serves 1612 students.

About

The school contains academic, athletic, technological, and performing arts facilities.  The academic wings of the school surround the Media Center, and follow a loop pattern. The school has main and an auxiliary gym, an indoor swimming pool, as well as an upstairs indoor track.  The football field contains a home grandstand, two concession stands, and a Fieldturf football field. The track is a full quarter mile, and is set parallel from the football field. In addition, there are tennis courts, a lacrosse field, four baseball fields, and a full practice football field.

The fine and performing arts wing of the school contains two computer labs (1 CAD), two art rooms, and a technology lab.  One of the art rooms contains a kiln and a dark room.   The band, orchestra, and choir rooms have full sound systems, projector screens, and full acoustic design implemented in the ceilings and walls. The auditorium seats approximately one thousand people and includes a second story balcony for additional seating. As of 2011, its mascot officially became a Jolly Knight. Before then, the school alternated between using images of a Jolly Knight and a chess Knight for its mascot imagery.

History
When Walled Lake Northern opened in August, 2002, only one half of the school was accessible to students.  The Gym, Pool, Auditorium, and Fine arts wing were still under construction throughout the 2002–03 school year.

Notable alumni
Connor Hellebuyck - Ice hockey goaltender for the Winnipeg Jets, Mike Richter Award and Vezina Trophy winner

References

Public high schools in Michigan
Educational institutions established in 2002
Schools in Commerce Township, Michigan
High schools in Oakland County, Michigan
2002 establishments in Michigan